James Hogan (born March, 1974) is a guitarist from Florida who has worked with the bands Left For Dead and Matt Mercado's Pivotman. Hogan also worked briefly with death metal pioneer Chuck Schuldiner of Death in the mid-1990s.

Hogan is a studio guitarist who is fluent in many styles of music. His touring and recording credits are extensive and diverse. Along with the metal legend Schuldiner and Mercado, Hogan has worked with the jazz pianist Dave Brubeck and the R&B singer Chaka Khan. Hogan toured in 2007 with the official band of NASCAR. He is a music pedagogist who teaches for the National Guitar Workshop and at a Florida college. He has a self-produced an instrumental jazz/rock fusion album entitled True Diversity. It was the #1 selling jazz disc of 2006 distributed by Guitar 9 Records. Hogan has several instructional videos published by TrueFire. He is an endorsee of Parker Guitars, Daddario Strings and Xotic Effects.

External links
Official James Hogan web page
Xotic Effects

1974 births
Living people
American rock guitarists
American male guitarists
21st-century American guitarists
21st-century American male musicians